Several members of the Wyon family were noted medal makers:

 Thomas Wyon the elder (1767–1830), British engraver
 Peter Wyon (1797–1822), British engraver
 Thomas Wyon (1792–1817), British engraver
 William Wyon (1795–1851), British engraver
 Benjamin Wyon (1802–1858), British engraver
 Leonard Charles Wyon (1826–1891), British engraver
 Joseph Shepherd Wyon (1836–1873), British engraver
 Alfred Benjamin Wyon (1837–1884), British engraver
 Edward Alexander Wyon (1842−1872), British architect and poet
 Olive Wyon (1881–1966), British author and translator
 Allan Wyon (1843–1907), British engraver
 Allan G. Wyon (1882–1962), British die-engraver and sculptor